The Girolami method, named after Gregory Girolami, is a predictive method for estimating densities of pure liquid components at room temperature. The objective of this method is the simple prediction of the density and not high precision.

Procedure 
The method uses purely additive volume contributions for single atoms and additional correction factors for components with special functional groups which cause a volume contraction and therefore a higher density. The Girolami method can be described as a mixture of an atom and group contribution method.

Atom contributions 
The method uses the following contributions for the different atoms:

A scaled molecular volume is calculated by

and the density is derived by

with the molecular weight M. The scaling factor 5 is used to obtain the density in g·cm−3.

Group contribution 
For some components Girolami found smaller volumes and higher densities than calculated solely by the atom contributions. For components with
 a hydroxylic function (Alcohols)
 a carboxylic function (Carboxylic acids)
 a primary or secondary amine function
 an amide group (incl. amides substituted at the nitrogen)
 a sulfoxide group
 a sulfone group
 a ring (non-condensed),
it is sufficient to add 10% to the density obtained by the main equation. For sulfone groups it is necessary to use this factor twice (20%).

Another specific case are condensed ring systems like Naphthalene. The density has to increased by 7.5% for every ring; for Naphthalene the resulting factor would be 15%.

If multiple corrections are needed their factors have to be added but not over 130% in total.

Example calculation

Quality 
The author has given a mean quadratic error (RMS) of 0.049 g·cm−3 for 166 checked components. Only for two components (acetonitrile and dibromochloromethane) has an error greater than 0.1 g·cm −3 been found.

References

External links 
 Online calculator for the Girolami model

Thermodynamic models